Anthocoris gallarumulmi is a true bug in the family Anthocoridae. The species is a West Palearctic species found on aphid-galled leaves of Ulmus minor and is a predator of the aphid Eriosoma ulmi  
It is also associated with aphid-leaf galls of Fraxinus excelsior, Ribes, Prunus spinosa and Crataegus monogyna.

References

External links
Anthocoris gallarumulmi images at  Consortium for the Barcode of Life

Anthocoridae
Insects described in 1773
Taxa named by Charles De Geer